Abdel Latif Ahmed (born August 13, 1983) is an Egyptian indoor volleyball player. He was part of the Egypt national team at the 2008 Summer Olympics. He is a middle blocker and is 202 cm tall.

Clubs
Current –  El Nasr
Debut –  AHLY

External links
FIVB profile

1983 births
Living people
Egyptian men's volleyball players
Sportspeople from Cairo
Volleyball players at the 2008 Summer Olympics
Olympic volleyball players of Egypt
Al Ahly (men's volleyball) players